Pol García Tena (born 18 February 1995) is a Spanish professional footballer who plays as a left-back or a centre-back for Italian  club Trento.

Career
Born in Terrassa, Barcelona, Catalonia, García played for the youth teams of RCD Espanyol and FC Barcelona between 2009 and 2011 before being released by the latter. It was reported that he was close on joining Juventus. While asked about the reason for joining the Italian club he said "It's always a great experience"

On 19 January 2013, García was named in a matchday squad for the first time, remaining an unused substitute in Juventus' 4–0 Serie A home win over Udinese. Three days later he was included for the only other time that season, again unused in a 1–1 home draw against Lazio in the Coppa Italia semi-final first leg.

On 2 September 2014, he was loaned out to Serie B club Vicenza. He made his debut five days later in a 2–1 away defeat against Trapani, playing the final 21 minutes in place of Oualid El Hasni. He scored his first career goal on 25 October, an added-time consolation in a 1–3 loss at Catania. He spent the following years on loan at Como, Crotone, Latina and Cremonese - all in the same tier.

On 11 July 2018, García joined Belgian club Sint-Truiden on a two-year deal. On 31 January 2021, he moved to Mexican club FC Juárez, and made his debut against Mazatlán FC.

On 22 March 2022, García signed with CD Lugo until the end of the 2021–22 season.

On 24 August 2022, García moved to Trento in Italian Serie C on a two-year deal.

Personal life
His brother Jesús is also a footballer.

Career statistics

References

External links
 
 

1995 births
Living people
Footballers from Terrassa
Spanish footballers
Association football defenders
Juventus F.C. players
L.R. Vicenza players
Como 1907 players
F.C. Crotone players
U.S. Cremonese players
Sint-Truidense V.V. players
FC Juárez footballers
CD Lugo players
A.C. Trento 1921 players
Serie B players
Belgian Pro League players
Liga MX players
Segunda División players
Serie C players
Spain youth international footballers
Spanish expatriate footballers
Expatriate footballers in Italy
Expatriate footballers in Belgium
Expatriate footballers in Mexico
Spanish expatriate sportspeople in Italy
Spanish expatriate sportspeople in Belgium
Spanish expatriate sportspeople in Mexico